The Black River Formation is a geologic formation in Quebec, Canada and Michigan, United States. It preserves fossils dating back to the Ordovician period.

See also

 List of fossiliferous stratigraphic units in Quebec
 List of fossiliferous stratigraphic units in Michigan

References
 

Ordovician System of North America
Ordovician Quebec
Ordovician Michigan
Middle Ordovician Series